Victoria București was a Romanian football club, dissolved right after the Romanian Revolution of 1989.

History

The club was sponsored by the Romanian Ministry of Internal Affairs (the "Miliția", Police). In 1985 Victoria played for the first time in the Romanian top division, becoming very fast one of the most important teams, behind Steaua and Dinamo București. Between 1986 and 1989 they finished every year in 3rd place. However, it was a well-known fact during that time that many victories were due to unfair influences over the referees, other teams' players and even officials. This is why in 1990, right after the Revolution, the team was dissolved by the Romanian Football Federation and the club literally disappeared.

The team was founded in 1949, in the neighborhood of Obor, being the branch of Dinamo București and promoted to Division B in 1953 under the name of Dinamo 6. In 1957 became Dinamo Obor, in 1958 was named A.S. Pompierul, then again Dinamo Obor (1959–1963), Dinamo Victoria (1963–1967), then Electronica Obor since 1967. Dinamo Victoria returns in Division C in 1980, becoming Victoria in 1985 when they promoted in the first division for the first time in history.

It was the sixth club representing Divizia B which reached the Romanian Cup final, which was lost with 0–2 in front of Progresul București.

Chronology of names

Players

Victoria was known as a team that enrolled only good players, however not good enough to be enrolled by Steaua or Dinamo. They were either players in their retirement age (such as Ionel Augustin, Costel Orac, Cornel Țălnar or Claudiu Vaișcovici) or talents not good enough for the "big 2" (such as Marcel Coraș, Ovidiu Hanganu, Marian Pană or Sándor Kulcsár). Many players came from Dinamo (in fact, Victoria's stadium was a training field inside the Dinamo Sport Complex). The Victoria Ground is known now as the "Florea Dumitrache Field" in honor of the Romanian striker, who played 11 seasons for Dinamo and 7 years for the Romania national football team.

European Cups

Even so, during its short existence, the club reached one quarter final in the UEFA Cup 1988–89. They were eliminated by Dynamo Dresden (1–1 in Bucharest and 0–4 in Dresden), a team from former East Germany, where Matthias Sammer was a young rising star.

Trivia
 The last president of the club was Dumitru Dragomir, who later became the president of the Romanian Football League and a Romanian politician.
 Between 1985 and 1989, Victoria played 4 Romanian Cup semi-finals. They lost every time against Dinamo with 2 goals (2–4 in 1986, 1987, 1988 and 0–2 in 1989). Subsequently, Dinamo always played the final against Steaua, losing it on 3 occasions (1987, 1988 and 1989).

Honours

Liga I:
Best finish: 3rd 1986–87, 1987–88, 1988–89

Liga II:
Winners (1): 1984–85
Runners-up (2): 1959–60, 1982–83

Liga III:
Winners (2): 1964–65, 1981–82

Cupa României:
Finalists (1): 1959–60 (under the name of Dinamo Obor București)

Victoria București in Europe

References

External links
RomanianSoccer.ro

 
Association football clubs established in 1949
Defunct football clubs in Romania
Football clubs in Bucharest
Association football clubs disestablished in 1990
Liga I clubs
Liga II clubs
1949 establishments in Romania
1990 disestablishments in Romania